Aedes scapularis is a species of mosquito primarily found in neo-tropical regions of the Americas.

Classification
Aedes scapularis is one of many species of the genus Aedes.
Several Aedes species have been reclassified as Ochlerotatus, with Ae. scapulari sometimes included in this revision.

Distribution
Aedes scapularis has been recorded throughout neo-tropical regions of the western hemisphere. Larval specimens were reported in the Florida Keys in 1945, and in 2020 the species was reported as being endemic in Miami-Dade and Broward counties in Florida.

Biology
Its habitat was originally associated with forest habitats, but it has become urbanized and is now reported breeding in artificial water containers.

Forattini & Gomes 1988 reported that this mosquito showed diurnal and nocturnal activity, but was most active during the evening crepuscular period.

Medical importance
It is known to bite humans and can carry a number of diseases, including yellow fever, Venezuelan equine encephalitis virus, and other human pathogens.

In 2021, authorities in southeastern Florida stated that, although it has become established there, this species of mosquito is not considered a vector of concern for disease in humans nor other animals, as the diseases it can transmit are not endemic to that area.

References

External links
 

Aedes
Insect vectors of human pathogens
Insects described in 1848
Taxa named by Camillo Rondani